In J. R. R. Tolkien's legendarium, the Lonely Mountain is a mountain northeast of Mirkwood. It is the location of the Dwarves' Kingdom under the Mountain and the town of Dale lies in a vale on its southern slopes.
In The Lord of the Rings, the mountain is called by the Sindarin name Erebor. The Lonely Mountain is the destination of the protagonists in The Hobbit and is the scene of the novel's climax.

The mountain is a symbol of adventure in The Hobbit, and of the titular Hobbit Bilbo Baggins's maturation as an individual.

Fictional mountain

Erebor stood hundreds of miles from the nearest mountain range. Tolkien's rendering of Thrór's map in The Hobbit shows it with six ridges stretching out from a central peak that was snowcapped well into spring.  The whole mountain was perhaps ten miles in diameter; it contained an immense wealth of gold and jewels.

Origins of the Kingdom under the Mountain 

Erebor became the home of the Folk of Durin, a clan of Dwarves known as the Longbeards, after they were driven from their ancestral home of Khazad-dûm. In the latter days of the Third Age, this Kingdom under the Mountain held one of the largest dwarvish treasure hoards in Middle-earth. Dale, a town of Men built between the two southern spurs of Erebor, grew in harmony with the dwarves. The Kingdom under the Mountain was founded by Thráin I the Old, who discovered the Arkenstone there. His son, Thorin I, left the mountain with much of the Folk of Durin to live in the Ered Mithrin (Grey Mountains) on account of the great riches to be found in that range. After dragons plundered their hoards, the Longbeards, led now by Thrór, a descendant of Thorin, returned to Erebor to take up the title King under the Mountain. Under Thrór's reign, Erebor became a great stronghold where the dwarves became numerous and prosperous, well known for the making of matchless weapons and armour.

Erebor in The Hobbit 

In the Third Age, while the young Thorin II Oakenshield was out hunting, the dragon Smaug flew south from the Grey Mountains, killed all the dwarves he could find, and destroyed the town of Dale. Smaug then took over the mountain, using the dwarves' hoard as a bed. King Thrór, his son Thráin II, and several companions escaped death by a secret door. Although Thrór and Thráin later perished, Thorin lived in exile in the Ered Luin, far to the west. On a journey, he met the wizard Gandalf. Together they formed a plan to reclaim the mountain. Gandalf insisted that burglary was the best approach and recommended the hobbit Bilbo Baggins, whom he represented to be a professional thief.

Bilbo, Thorin, and Thorin's company of twelve other Dwarves travelled to the Lonely Mountain to regain the treasure. They planned to use the secret door, whose key and map Gandalf had managed to obtain from Thráin, whom he had found at the point of death in the pits of Dol Guldur. On Durin's Day, when the setting sun and the last moon of autumn were in the sky together, the day's last sunlight would fall on the door and expose its keyhole so that it could be unlocked. By a fortunate coincidence, this happened soon after Bilbo and the Dwarves arrived, and the Hobbit was able to enter the mountain and steal a golden cup.

Smaug, enraged by the theft, emerged from the mountain and flew south to destroy Lake-town, which he thought to be the source of the "thieves". During this attack Smaug was killed by Bard the Bowman; Thorin claimed the mountain on learning of Smaug's demise. However, the Men of Esgaroth, supported by Thranduil and the Elves of Mirkwood, marched in force to the mountain to demand a part of the dragon's hoard as recompense for the destruction. Thorin, mad with greed, refused all claims and sent word to his second cousin Dáin II Ironfoot, chief of the Dwarves of the Iron Hills, who brought reinforcements to the aid of Thorin and Company. However before any battle began, an army of Orcs and Wargs descended on Erebor. Dwarves, Elves, and Men joined ranks against them, which led to the Battle of Five Armies. During this battle, Thorin's nephews Fíli and Kíli were killed, and Thorin himself was mortally injured; he died shortly afterwards. The title of King under the Mountain passed to Dáin.

Erebor in The Lord of the Rings 

With the restoration of the Kingdom under the Mountain the area became prosperous again. Dale was rebuilt under Bard's leadership, and Dwarves and Men reforged their friendship. Some of the Dwarves, led by Balin, left Erebor to reclaim the ancient Dwarvish Kingdom of Khazad-dûm (also known as Moria). They established a colony there but five years later Balin was killed by an Orc, and soon after Moria was overrun by Orcs and the rest of the Dwarves were killed. Gimli, a dwarf of Erebor and the son of Glóin, one of Thorin's twelve companions, was chosen to represent his people in the Fellowship of the Ring; he helped Aragorn regain the throne of Gondor.

In the War of the Ring, an emissary from Sauron, the lord of Mordor, twice came to Erebor and spoke to Dáin Ironfoot, who was still King under the Mountain. The messenger asked for assistance in finding Bilbo Baggins and retrieving a stolen ring, and in return offered Moria and three of the seven Dwarf rings to Dáin, but he said neither Yea or Nay. Sauron's northern army, which included many Easterlings, then attacked; Dale was overrun, and many Dwarves and Men took refuge in Erebor, which was promptly surrounded. Dáin was killed before the gates of Erebor defending the body of his fallen ally King Brand of Dale. Dáin's son Thorin III Stonehelm and King Bard II withstood the siege and routed Sauron's forces.

Reception 

Dorothy Matthews, viewing The Hobbit as a psychological quest, writes that the Lonely Mountain is an apt symbol of Bilbo's maturation as an individual, as the place where he takes on a leadership role and acts and makes decisions independently. The Tolkien scholar Jared Lobdell comments that he is "profoundly unsympathetic" to Matthews's approach, but that she "carries it off well". Lobdell explains, citing C. S. Lewis's essay "Psychoanalysis and Literary Criticism", that many different stories could, for instance, have the same Freudian interpretation, but be quite different as literature. He remarks on the other hand that a psychoanalytic approach is at least richer than a purely materialistic one.

William H. Green calls the Lonely Mountain the fourth and final stage of Bilbo's education. He identifies multiple parallels and repetitions of structure between the stages, each one involving a journey, privation, and "unlikely escape". The Lonely Mountain stage, too, symbolically echoes the first stage in the Shire: before setting out, Bilbo was peacefully smoking a pipe of tobacco at his own front door; at the mountain, the smoke is the dragon's, and its meaning is anything but peaceful. The Christian writer Joseph Pearce views the journey to the Lonely Mountain as a "pilgrimage of grace", a Christian bildungsroman, at its deepest level. Pearce states further that Bilbo's quest to the mountain parallels Frodo's quest to a different mountain, Mount Doom,  which he calls "a mirror of Everyman's journey through life".

Tom Shippey notes that in The Hobbit, the lonely mountain is a symbol of adventure, and the "true end" of the story is the moment when Bilbo looks back from a high pass and sees "There far away was the Lonely Mountain on the edge of eyesight. On its highest peak snow yet unmelted was gleaming pale. 'So comes snow after fire, and even dragons have their ending!' said Bilbo, and he turned his back on his adventure."

Amelia Harper, in the J. R. R. Tolkien Encyclopedia, writes that the mountain's history, as usual for the Dwarves, was a tale of "beauty gained and lives lost".

Adaptations 

The Lonely Mountain: Lair of Smaug the Dragon is a board game produced in 1985 by Iron Crown Enterprises, designed by Coleman Charlton, which features groups of adventurers, either Dwarves, Elves, Orcs or Men entering Smaug's Lair to capture his treasure before he awakens.

"Erebor", specifically the southern spurs of the Mountain and Dale, is a playable map in The Lord of the Rings: The Battle for Middle-earth II. It has three gates, including the one Tolkien described and two which cannot be closed, to allow those playing as invading forces to easily enter the stronghold.

The Lonely Mountain appears in Peter Jackson's film adaptations of The Hobbit:  An Unexpected Journey, The Desolation of Smaug, and The Battle of the Five Armies. The actual setting was Mount Ruapehu in New Zealand.

In astronomy

The International Astronomical Union names all mountains on Saturn's moon Titan after mountains in Tolkien's work.  In 2012, they named a mountain on Titan "Erebor Mons" after the Lonely Mountain.

References

Primary 
This list identifies each item's location in Tolkien's writings.

Secondary

Sources 

 
 
 

Middle-earth realms
Fictional kingdoms
Fictional mountains